Álvaro Roncal Rivera (born 25 December 2000) is a Spanish professional footballer who plays as a right back for CD Vitoria.

Club career
An UDC Txantrea youth graduate, Roncal first appeared with the main squad on 4 May 2019, starting in a 1–1 Tercera División home draw against Beti Kozkor KE. In July of that year, he moved to SD Eibar and was assigned to the second reserve team SD Eibar Urko in the regional leagues.

Ahead of the 2021–22 campaign, Roncal was assigned to farm team CD Vitoria in the Tercera División RFEF. He made his first-team debut for the Armeros on 15 December 2021, starting in a 2–1 away win over CD Tenerife in the season's Copa del Rey.

Personal life
Roncal's brother Adrián is also a footballer. A forward, he represented UCD Burladés and CD Egüés as a senior.

References

External links
 
 
 

2000 births
Living people
People from Cuenca de Pamplona
Spanish footballers
Footballers from Navarre
Association football defenders
Tercera División players
Tercera Federación players
Divisiones Regionales de Fútbol players
CD Vitoria footballers
SD Eibar footballers